Pino Grioni (10 May 1932 – 30 July 2020) was an Italian painter, sculptor and ceramist.

References

1932 births
2020 deaths
People from the Province of Lodi
Artists from Milan
20th-century Italian painters
21st-century Italian painters
20th-century Italian sculptors
20th-century Italian male artists
21st-century Italian sculptors
Italian ceramists
21st-century Italian male artists